The  was an infantry division in the Imperial Japanese Army.

History
The Nagoya Garrison had responsibility for the central region of Japan. This region was known as the Chūbu district, and stretched from Aichi Prefecture to Ishikawa Prefecture. Upon the recommendations of the Prussian military advisor Jakob Meckel to the Japanese government, the six regional commands were transformed into divisions under the army reorganization of 14 May 1888.

As one of the oldest divisions in the Imperial Japanese Army, the 3rd Division participated in combat operations during the First Sino-Japanese War, the Russo-Japanese War, the Siberian Intervention, and the Shandong Incident.

Some of its more noteworthy commanders included Katsura Taro, Hasegawa Yoshimichi, Uehara Yusaku and Nobuyoshi Muto.

9 December 1938, the 3rd Division was subordinated to 11th Army and was subsequently was one of the divisions assigned to the China Expeditionary Army (CGA) headquartered in Nanjing. As one of the most powerful units ("crack" units) in the theatre, the 3rd Division served in nearly every battle in central China. During the Zhejiang-Jiangxi Campaign it was converted into a triangular division on July 4, 1942. It later served, for a time as a headquarters and garrison division for strategic Zhejiang Province.

Battles and Campaigns fought in China (1937–1945)

Battle of West Henan-North Hubei (possibly messed up with 3rd Tank Division)

At the end of World War II, with the dissolution of the Imperial Japanese Army, the 3rd Division was formally disbanded in Zhejiang.

See also
 List of Japanese Infantry Divisions

Reference and further reading

 

Japanese World War II divisions
Infantry divisions of Japan
Military units and formations established in 1871
Military units and formations disestablished in 1945
1871 establishments in Japan
1945 disestablishments in Japan
Nanjing Massacre perpetrators